The hyperbolastic functions, also known as hyperbolastic growth models, are mathematical functions that are used in medical statistical modeling. These models were originally developed to capture the growth dynamics of multicellular tumor spheres, and were introduced in 2005 by Mohammad Tabatabai, David Williams, and Zoran Bursac. The precision of hyperbolastic functions in modeling real world problems is somewhat due to their flexibility in their point of inflection. These functions can be used in a wide variety of modeling problems such as tumor growth, stem cell proliferation, pharma kinetics, cancer growth, sigmoid activation function in neural networks, and epidemiological disease progression or regression.

The hyperbolastic functions can model both growth and decay curves until it reaches carrying capacity. Due to their flexibility, 
these models have diverse applications in the medical field, with the ability to capture disease progression with an intervening
treatment. As the figures indicate, hyperbolastic functions can fit a sigmoidal curve indicating that the slowest rate occurs at 
the early and late stages. In addition to the presenting sigmoidal shapes, it can also accommodate biphasic situations where medical  
interventions slow or reverse disease progression; but, when the effect of the treatment vanishes, the disease will begin the 
second phase of its progression until it reaches its horizontal asymptote.

One of the main characteristics these functions have is that they cannot only fit sigmoidal shapes, but can also model biphasic growth patterns that other classical sigmoidal curves cannot adequately model. This distinguishing feature has advantageous applications in various fields including medicine, biology, economics, engineering, agronomy, and computer aided system theory.

Function H1 

The hyperbolastic rate equation of type I, denoted H1, is given by

where  is any real number and 
The parameter  represents carrying capacity, and parameters  and  jointly represent growth rate. The parameter  gives the distance from a symmetric sigmoidal curve. Solving the hyperbolastic rate equation of type I for  gives

where  is the inverse hyperbolic sine function. If one desires to use the initial condition , then  can be expressed as

.

If , then  reduces to

.

The hyperbolastic function of type I generalizes the logistic function. If the parameters , then it would become a logistic function. This function  is a hyperbolastic function of type I. The standard hyperbolastic function of type I is

.

Function H2 

The hyperbolastic rate equation of type II, denoted by H2, is defined as

where  is the hyperbolic tangent function,  is the carrying capacity, and both  and  jointly determine the growth rate. In addition, the parameter  represents acceleration in the time course. Solving the hyperbolastic rate function of type II for  gives

.

If one desires to use initial condition  then  can be expressed as

.

If , then  reduces to

.

The standard hyperbolastic function of type II is defined as

.

Function H3 

The hyperbolastic rate equation of type III is denoted by H3 and has the form

,

where  > 0. The parameter  represents the carrying capacity, and the parameters   and  jointly determine the growth rate. The parameter  represents acceleration of the time scale, while the size of  represents distance from a symmetric sigmoidal curve. The solution to the differential equation of type III is

,

with the initial condition  we can express  as

.

The hyperbolastic distribution of type III is a three-parameter family of continuous probability distributions with scale parameters  > 0, and  ≥ 0 and parameter  as the shape parameter. When the parameter  = 0, the hyperbolastic distribution of type III is reduced to the weibull distribution. The hyperbolastic cumulative distribution function of type III is given by

,

and its corresponding probability density function is

.

The hazard function  (or failure rate) is given by

The survival function  is given by

The standard hyperbolastic cumulative distribution function of type III is defined as

,

and its corresponding probability density function is

.

Properties 

If one desires to calculate the point  where the population reaches a percentage of its carrying capacity , then 
one can solve the equation
 
For instance, the half point can be found by setting .

Applications 

According to stem cell researchers at McGowan Institute for Regenerative Medicine at the University of Pittsburgh, "a newer model [called the hyperbolastic type III or] H3 is a differential equation that also describes the cell growth. This model allows for much more variation and has been proven to better predict growth."

The hyperbolastic growth models H1, H2, and H3 have been applied to analyze the growth of solid Ehrlich carcinoma using a variety of treatments.

In animal science, the hyperbolastic functions have been used for modeling broiler chicken growth. The hyperbolastic model of type III was used to determine the size of the recovering wound.

In the area of wound healing, the hyperbolastic models accurately representing the time course of healing. Such functions have been used to investigate variations in the healing velocity among different kinds of wounds and at different stages in the healing process taking into consideration the areas of trace elements, growth factors, diabetic wounds, and nutrition.

Another application of hyperbolastic functions is in the area of the stochastic diffusion process, whose mean function is a hyperbolastic curve. The main characteristics of the process are studied and the maximum likelihood estimation for the parameters of the process is considered.
To this end, the firefly metaheuristic optimization algorithm is applied after bounding the parametric space by a stage wise procedure. Some examples based on simulated sample paths and real data illustrate this development. A sample path of a diffusion process models the trajectory of a particle embedded in a flowing fluid and subjected to random displacements due to collisions with other particles, which is called Brownian motion. The hyperbolastic function of type III was used to model the proliferation of both adult mesenchymal and embryonic stem cells; and, the hyperbolastic mixed model of type II has been used in modeling cervical cancer data. Hyperbolastic curves can be an important tool in analyzing cellular growth, the fitting of biological curves, the growth of phytoplankton, and instantaneous maturity rate.

In forest ecology and management, the hyperbolastic models have been applied to model the relationship between DBH and height.

The multivariable hyperbolastic model type III has been used to analyze the growth dynamics of phytoplankton taking into consideration the concentration of nutrients.

Hyperbolastic regressions

Hyperbolastic regressions are statistical models that utilize standard hyperbolastic functions to model a dichotomous or multinomial outcome variable. The purpose of hyperbolastic regression is to predict an outcome using a set of explanatory (independent) variables. These types of regressions are routinely used in many areas including medical, public health, dental, biomedical, as well as social, behavioral, and engineering sciences. For instance, binary regression analysis has been used to predict endoscopic lesions in iron deficiency anemia. In addition, binary regression was applied to differentiate between malignant and benign adnexal mass prior to surgery.

The binary hyperbolastic regression of type I
Let  be a binary outcome variable which can assume one of two mutually exclusive values, success or failure.

. 
The odds of success is the ratio of the probability of success to the probability of failure.

.

.

Shannon information for binary hyperbolastic of type I (H1)
The Shannon information for the random variable  is defined as

For the binary hyperbolastic regression of type I, the information  is given by

,

For a random sample of binary outcomes of size , the average empirical information for hyperbolastic H1 can be estimated by

,

Information Entropy for hyperbolastic H1 
Information entropy measures the loss of information in a transmitted message or signal. In machine learning applications, it is the number of bits necessary to transmit a randomly selected event from a probability distribution. For a discrete random variable , the information entropy  is defined as

where  is the probability mass function for the random variable .

The Information entropy has many applications in machine learning and artificial intelligence such as classification modeling and decision trees. For the hyperbolastic H1, the entropy  is equal to

Binary Cross-entropy for hyperbolastic H1 
The binary cross-entropy compares the observed  with the predicted probabilities.

Kullback-Leibler Divergence for hyperbolastic H1 
Kullback-Leibler divergence is a dissimilarity measure which estimates the number of bits required to represent a message when using hyperbolastic probability distribution H1 and is equal to

and the average value of Kullback-Leibler Divergence  is

The binary hyperbolastic regression of type II
The hyperbolastic regression of type II is an alternative method for the analysis of binary data with robust properties. For the binary outcome variable , the hyperbolastic success probability of type II is a function of a -dimensional vector of explanatory variables  given by

 ,		

The logit transformation  is given by

Shannon information for binary hyperbolastic of type II (H2)
For the binary hyperbolastic regression H2, the Shannon information  is given by

For a random sample of binary outcomes of size , the average empirical information for hyperbolastic H2 is estimated by

Information Entropy for hyperbolastic H2 
For the hyperbolastic H2, the information entropy  is equal to

and the estimated average entropy  for hyperbolastic H2 is

Binary Cross-entropy for hyperbolastic H2 
The average binary cross-entropy  for hyperbolastic H2 is

Kullback-Leibler Divergence for hyperbolastic H2 
For hyperbolastic H2, the Kullback-Leibler Divergence is equal to

and the average value of Kullback-Leibler Divergence  is

Parameter estimation for the binary hyperbolastic regression of type I and II

The estimate of the parameter vector  can be obtained by maximizing the log-likelihood function

where  is defined according to one of the two types of hyberbolastic functions used.

The multinomial hyperbolastic regression of type I and II

The generalization of the binary hyperbolastic regression to multinomial hyperbolastic regression has a response variable  for individual  with  categories (i.e. ). When , this model reduces to a binary hyperbolastic regression.
For each , we form  indicator variables  where

,
                                               
meaning that  whenever the  response is in category  and  otherwise.

           
                      

Similarly, for the multinomial hyperbolastic regression of type II we have
                      

 

Shannon Information for multiclass hyperbolastic H1 or H2
For the multiclass , the Shannon information  is

.

For a random sample of size , the empirical multiclass information can be estimated by
.

Multiclass Entropy in Information Theory 
For a discrete random variable , the multiclass information entropy is defined as

where  is the probability mass function for the multiclass random variable .
 
For the hyperbolastic H1 or H2, the multiclass entropy  is equal to

The estimated average multiclass entropy  is equal to

Multiclass Cross-entropy for hyperbolastic H1 or H2 
Multiclass cross-entropy compares the observed multiclass output with the predicted probabilities. For a random sample of multiclass outcomes of size , the average multiclass cross-entropy  for hyperbolastic H1 or H2 can be estimated by

Kullback-Leibler Divergence for multiclass hyperbolastic H1 or H2
The average Kullback-Leibler divergence  for multiclass hyperbolastic H1 or H2 is equal to

         

The estimated parameter matrix  of multinomial hyperbolastic regression is obtained by maximizing the log-likelihood function. The maximum likelihood estimates of the parameter matrix  is

References

Medical models
Population models
Special functions